Peeper or Peepers may refer to:

 Peeper (film), a 1976 comedy film
 Peepers (film), a 2010 film
 Peepers (Marvel Comics), a comic book character
 A person engaging in voyeurism
 The spring peeper, a small tree frog
 Marcel Peeper (born 1965), Dutch footballer
 Eyes

See also
 Peep (disambiguation)
 Peeping (disambiguation)